Huseynov, Hüseynov, Guseinov, Gusseinov or Guseynov (masculine) and Huseynova, Guseinova, Gusseinova or Guseynova (feminine) is an Azerbaijani surname. It is slavicized from the Arabic male given name Hussein. It may refer to:

Guseinov / Guseynov
Aidyn Guseinov (1955–2003), Azerbaijani chess player 
Badavi Guseynov (born 1991), Azerbaijani football player
Gadir Guseinov (born 1986), Azerbaijani chess grandmaster
Vadim Gusseinov (born 1968), Kazakhstani ice hockey player

Huseynov
Elmar Huseynov (1967–2005), independent Azerbaijani journalist, harsh critic of Azerbaijani authorities
Elnur Hüseynov (born 1987), Azerbaijani pop singer
Heydar Huseynov (1908–1950), Azerbaijani philosopher and academician
Javid Huseynov (born 1988), Azerbaijani footballer
Mirza Davud Huseynov (1894–1938), Azerbaijani revolutionary and statesman
Ramal Huseynov (born 1984), Azerbaijan footballer
Rovshan Huseynov (born 1975), Azerbaijani amateur boxer
Surat Huseynov (born 1959), Azerbaijani military officer and ex-Prime Minister 
Tymerlan Huseynov (born 1968), Ukrainian sporting director and former football player
Zelimkhan Huseynov (born 1981), Azerbaijani wrestler

See also
Huseyn

Kazakh-language surnames
Azerbaijani-language surnames
Patronymic surnames
Surnames from given names
Surnames of Azerbaijani origin
Surnames of Kazakhstani origin